Frank Pollard (born June 15, 1957) is a former professional American football player who played running back for nine seasons for the Pittsburgh Steelers.

He may be best remembered for his record setting performance at the 1976 Texas state track championships.  The "Faces In The Crowd" article in the June 14, 1976 issue of Sports Illustrated stated:

Frank Pollard Jr., 19, a senior at Meridian High, a class B school, became the highest scorer in the history of the Texas high school track meet, winning the discus (154'9"), the shot (56'3"), the 100 (9.9) and the 220 (21.8). His sprint-relay team also placed fourth.
 
Currently, Mr. Pollard works at the Methodist Children's Home in Waco, Texas, where he helps children and young adults in their development.

References

1957 births
Living people
People from Clifton, Texas
American football running backs
Pittsburgh Steelers players
Baylor Bears football players